Broome County is a county in the U.S. state of New York. As of the 2020 United States census, the county had a population of 198,683. Its county seat is Binghamton. The county was named for John Broome, the state's lieutenant governor when Broome County was created.

The county is part of the Binghamton, NY Metropolitan Statistical Area. It is home to Binghamton University, one of four university centers in the State University of New York (SUNY) system.

History
When counties were established in the Province of New York in 1683, the present Broome County was part of the enormous Albany County, including the northern part of New York State as well as all of the present State of Vermont and, in theory, extending westward to the Pacific Ocean. This county was reduced in size on July 3, 1766, by the creation of Cumberland County, and further on March 16, 1770, by the creation of Gloucester County, both containing territory now in Vermont.

On March 12, 1772, what was left of Albany County was split into three parts, one remaining under the name Albany County. One of the other pieces, Tryon County, contained the western portion (and thus, since no western boundary was specified, theoretically still extended west to the Pacific). The eastern boundary of Tryon County was approximately five miles west of the present city of Schenectady, and the county included the western part of the Adirondack Mountains and the area west of the West Branch of the Delaware River. The area then designated as Tryon County now is organized as 37 counties of New York State. The county was named for William Tryon, colonial governor of New York.

In the years prior to 1776, most of the Loyalists in Tryon County fled to Canada. In 1784, following the peace treaty that ended the American Revolutionary War, the name of Tryon County was changed to Montgomery County, for General Richard Montgomery, who had captured several places in Canada and died attempting to capture the city of Quebec, thus replacing the name of the hated British governor.

In 1789, Montgomery County was reduced in size by the splitting off of Ontario County. The actual area split off from Montgomery County was much larger than the present county, also including the present Allegany, Cattaraugus, Chautauqua, Erie, Genesee, Livingston, Monroe, Niagara, Orleans, Steuben, Wyoming, Yates, and part of Schuyler and Wayne Counties.

In 1791, Tioga County split off from Montgomery County, along with Herkimer and Otsego Counties. Tioga County was at this time much larger than the present county and included the present Broome and Chemung Counties and parts of Chenango and Schuyler Counties.

In 1798, Tioga County was reduced in size by the splitting off of Chemung County (which also included part of the present Schuyler County) and by the combination of a portion with a portion of Herkimer County to create Chenango County.

In 1806, the present-day Broome County was split off from Tioga County.

Geography
Broome County lies on the southern line of New York. Its southern border abuts the northern boundary of the state of Pennsylvania. The Susquehanna River flows southward through the eastern part of the county, enters Susquehanna County in Pennsylvania, then re-enters Broome and flows northwestward to meet the Chenango River at Binghamton. The combined flow moves west-southwestward into Tioga County to the west. The West Branch Delaware River flows southward along the lower portion of the county's east border, delineating that portion of the border between Broome and Delaware counties.

The county's western portion is hilly, with wide valleys that accommodate Binghamton and its suburbs. In the northern portion, Interstate 81 traverses a wide glacial valley. The eastern part of the county is much more rugged, as the land rises to the Catskill Mountains. The terrain generally slopes to the west. The county's highest point is in the southeast of the county, a U.S. National Geodetic Survey benchmark known as Slawson atop an unnamed hill in the Town of Sanford. It is approximately 2087 feet (636 m) above sea level. An area due east on the Delaware County line in Oquaga Creek State Park also lies within the same elevation contour line. The lowest point is 864 feet (263 m) above sea level, along the Susquehanna River, at the Pennsylvania state line.

Adjacent counties

 Chenango County – northeast
 Delaware County – east
 Wayne County, Pennsylvania – southeast
 Susquehanna County, Pennsylvania – south
 Tioga County – west
 Cortland County – northwest

Protected areas
Source:

 Aqua-Terra Wilderness Area
 Beaver Flow State Forest (part)
 Beaver Pond State Forest
 Cascade Valley State Forest
 Cat Hollow State Forest
 Chenango Valley State Park
 Dorchester County Park
 Greenwood County Park (part)
 Hawkins Pond State Forest
 Marsh Pond State Forest
 Nathaniel Cole County Park
 Oquaga Creek State Park (part)
 Skyline Drive State Forest
 Triangle State Forest
 Whitney Point Multiple Use Area (part)
 Whittacker Swamp State Forest

Lakes
Source:

 Agwaterra Pond
 Blueberry Lake
 Chenango Lake
 Deer Lake
 Fly Pond
 Hawkins Pond
 Hust Pond
 Laurel Lake
 Lily Lake
 Nanticoke Lake
 Oquaga Lake
 Otselic River
 Potato Creek
 Sky Lake
 Summit Lake

Major highways

 
 /Quickway

Demographics

2020 census

Note: The US Census treats Hispanic/Latino as an ethnic category. This table excludes Latinos from the racial categories and assigns them to a separate category. Hispanics/Latinos can be of any race.

2000 census
As of the 2000 United States Census, there were 200,536 people, 80,749 households, and 50,225 families in the county.  The population density was 284/1/sqmi (109.7/km2). There were 88,817 housing units at an average density of 125.8/sqmi (48.6/km2). The racial makeup of the county was 91.33% White, 3.28% Black or African American, 0.19% Native American, 2.79% Asian, 0.03% Pacific Islander, 0.79% from other races, and 1.59% from two or more races.  1.99% of the population were Hispanic or Latino of any race. 16.1% were of Irish, 13.3% Italian, 12.3% German, 11.6% English, 6.4% American and 5.7% Polish ancestry according to Census 2000. 91.4% spoke English, 2.0% Spanish and 1.1% Italian as their first language.

There were 80,749 households, out of which 28.20% had children under the age of 18 living with them, 47.60% were married couples living together, 10.80% had a female householder with no husband present, and 37.80% were non-families. 31.00% of all households were made up of individuals, and 12.40% had someone living alone who was 65 years of age or older.  The average household size was 2.37 and the average family size was 2.97.

The county population contained 23.00% under the age of 18, 11.00% from 18 to 24, 26.80% from 25 to 44, 22.80% from 45 to 64, and 16.40% who were 65 years of age or older. The median age was 38 years. For every 100 females there were 93.20 males. For every 100 females age 18 and over, there were 89.90 males.

The median income for a household in the county was $35,347, and the median income for a family was $45,422. Males had a median income of $34,426 versus $24,542 for females. The per capita income for the county was $19,168.  About 8.80% of families and 12.80% of the population were below the poverty line, including 15.90% of those under age 18 and 7.20% of those age 65 or over.

Climate
Broome has a warm-summer humid continental climate (Dfb) and the hardiness zone is mainly 5b.

Government and politics
For the past few decades, Broome County has been a swing county. Since 1964 the county has selected Democratic and Republican party candidates at approximately the same rate in national elections (as of 2016). The more recent elections had favored the Democratic candidate, until Donald Trump carried the county in 2016, the first Republican to win the county since Ronald Reagan in 1984. Joe Biden carried Broome with 50.5% of the vote in 2020. In Broome County, Democratic strength comes primarily from Binghamton and its suburbs, such as Johnson City and Endicott, while Republicans dominate the outer, rural parts of the county. 

|}

Broome County's offices are housed in the Edwin L. Crawford County Office Building of Government Plaza located at 60 Hawley Street in Downtown Binghamton.

Executive

Legislature
The Broome County Legislature consists of 15 members. The 15 legislature members are elected from individual districts. Currently, there are 9 Republicans and 6 Democrats.

Party affiliation

Law enforcement 
, the sheriff of Broome County is Frederick J. Akshar II. The Broome County Office of Sheriff is the main law enforcement agency at the county level. With this being said, municipalities often provide their own police agencies which work with Deputy sheriffs. The Broome County Office of Sheriff was established in 1806 and provides services to a population of approximately 197,000 people in an 850-mile patrol area. Deputy sheriffs often provide essential police services to communities that lack their own police department, such as the Town of Dickinson, Town of Chenango, and Town of Windsor. Deputy sheriffs are often found throughout the county assisting local police agencies even in communities with their own law enforcement agency, filling a vital gap within local law enforcement. Deputy sheriffs are not limited by municipalities and work in a variety of capacities throughout the Greater Binghamton area. The Broome County Office of Sheriff also makes significant contributions to law enforcement throughout Greater Binghamton, and the Southern Tier of New York State. The Broome County Office of Sheriff is assisted by numerous local, county, state, and federal law enforcement entities such as the City of Binghamton Police Department.  

The Broome County Office of Sheriff is responsible for the 536 bed Broome County Jail. Deputy sheriffs play a vital role within courts & corrections, escorting defendants and working with agency partners to ensure the continuation of the judicial system. 

The Broome County Office of Sheriff also hosts the Broome County Law Enforcement Academy which facilitates the New York State mandated Basic Course for Police Officers, including over 700 hours of instruction. All municipal police officers and deputy sheriffs within Broome County attend this academy. In addition, often times officers from outside Greater Binghamton attend the academy. The academy frequently hosts officers from the Elmira-Corning area, Syracuse Metropolitan Area, and other regions within New York State. 

Throughout the departments history, only one deputy has been killed in the line of duty. Deputy Sheriff Kevin J. Tarsia was murdered on July 4th, 2002 while interacting with 2 suspicious individuals in rural Broome County.  The incident caused a feeling of loss throughout the Greater Binghamton Area, and to this day still effects the community around him. The suspect who murdered Deputy Sheriff Tarsia later escaped from prison and was apprehended by the New York State Police.

Education
The primary institutes of higher education in Broome County include:
 Binghamton University (enrollment 16,000)
 Broome Community College (BCC)
 Davis College – a private Christian college in Johnson City

Communities

Larger Settlements 

† – County Seat

‡ – Not Wholly in this County

Towns

 Barker
 Binghamton
 Chenango
 Colesville
 Conklin
 Dickinson
 Fenton
 Kirkwood
 Lisle
 Maine
 Nanticoke
 Sanford
 Triangle
 Union
 Vestal
 Windsor

Hamlets

 Castle Creek
 Center Lisle
 Chenango Bridge
 Chenango Forks
 Glen Castle
 Hawleyton
 Hillcrest
 Hydeville
 Itaska
 Kattelville
 Newmans Corners
 Nimmonsburg
 North Fenton
 Nineveh
 Pleasant Hill
 Port Crane
 Quinneville
 Summit Hill
 West Chenango
 Wyman Corner

Census-designated places
 Binghamton University
 Chenango Bridge
 Endwell
 Glen Aubrey

Notable people

 John Allen, dentist and inventor of new denture method
 Ira Cook (1821–1902), Iowa land surveyor and businessman, born in Broome County
 Daniel S. Dickinson (1800–1866), US Senator, lived in Broome County
 John Ducey (1969– ), actor, born in Broome County
 Barzillai Gray (1824–1918), judge, born in Broome County
 Robert Harpur (1731–1825), colonial teacher, politician, pioneer, for whom Harpur College (now Binghamton University) was named, settled at Harpursville
 Johnny Hart (1931–2007), cartoonist, creator of B.C. and co-creator of The Wizard of Id, born in Broome County
 George F. Johnson (1857–1948), industrialist, philanthropist, co-founder of Endicott-Johnson Co., lived in Broome County
 Willis Sharpe Kilmer (1867–1940), industrialist and entrepreneur, lived in Broome County
 Rebecca Krohn, ballet dancer, born in Broome County
 Edwin A. Link (1904–1981), inventor, raised in Broome County
 David Ross Locke (1833–1888), Civil War journalist, born in Broome County
 Ron Luciano (1937–1995), baseball umpire, author, born in Broome County
 Billy Martin (1928–1989), baseball player, manager, retired to Broome County
 Leonard Melfi (1932–2001), author, playwright, born in Broome County
 William L. Mercereau (1866–1957), businessman, superintendent of carferries, born in Broome County
 Mary Blair Moody (1837–1919), physician, anatomist, born in Broome County
 Hidy Ochiai (1939– ), karate and judo grand master, author, actor, resides in Broome County
 Camille Paglia (1947– ), philosopher, author, born in Broome County
 Alice Freeman Palmer (1855–1902), educator, born in Broome County
 Amy Sedaris (1961– ), actress, author, playwright, born in Broome County
 David Sedaris (1956– ), comedian, essayist, playwright, born in Broome County
 Rod Serling (1924–1975), screenwriter, playwright, raised in Broome County
 Jack Sharkey (1902–1994), born Joseph Paul Cukoschay, world heavyweight boxing champion, 1931–33, born in Broome County

See also

 List of counties in New York
 National Register of Historic Places listings in Broome County, New York

Notes

References

Further reading

External links

 Broome County, New York
 
 Broome County Oral History Project, Binghamton University Libraries

 
Binghamton metropolitan area
Counties of Appalachia
1806 establishments in New York (state)
Populated places established in 1806